Zinc iodide is the inorganic compound with the formula ZnI2. It exists both in anhydrous form and as a dihydrate.  Both are white and readily absorb water from the atmosphere. It has no major application.

Preparation
It can be prepared by the direct reaction of zinc and iodine in water or in refluxing ether. or by treating zinc with iodine in aqueous solution:
 Zn + I2  →  ZnI2

Structure as solid, gas, and in solution
The structure of solid ZnI2 is unusual relative to the dichloride. While zinc centers are tetrahedrally coordinated, as in ZnCl2, groups of four of these tetrahedra share three vertices to form “super-tetrahedra” of composition {Zn4I10}, which are linked by their vertices to form a three-dimensional structure. These "super-tetrahedra" are similar to the P4O10 structure.

Molecular ZnI2 is linear as predicted by VSEPR theory with a Zn-I bond length of 238 pm.

In aqueous solution the following have been detected: Zn(H2O)62+, [ZnI(H2O)5]+, tetrahedral ZnI2(H2O)2, ZnI3(H2O)−, and ZnI42−.

Applications 
Zinc iodide is often used as an x-ray opaque penetrant in industrial radiography to improve the contrast between the damage and intact composite.
United States patent 4,109,065  describes a rechargeable aqueous zinc-halogen cell that includes an aqueous electrolytic solution containing a zinc salt selected from the class consisting of zinc bromide, zinc iodide, and mixtures thereof, in both positive and negative electrode compartments.
In combination with osmium tetroxide, ZnI2 is used as a stain in electron microscopy.
As a Lewis acid, zinc iodide catalyzes for the conversion of methanol to triptane and hexamethylbenzene.

References

zinc
Metal halides
iodide